A particularly vulnerable tribal group or PVTG (previously known as a Primitive tribal group), in the context of India, is a sub-classification of Scheduled Tribe or section of a Scheduled Tribe, that is considered more vulnerable than a regular Scheduled Tribe. The PVTG list was created by the Indian Government with the purpose of better improving the living standards of endangered tribal groups based on priority.

Origin of the concept
The Dhebar Commission (1960-1961) found that within the Scheduled Tribe classification an inequality existed in the rate of development of certain tribes over others. As a result in the fourth Five Year Plan the sub-category "Primitive tribal group" was created within the grouping of Scheduled Tribe to identify groups considered to be especially lacking in modern development. The features of such a group include a pre-agricultural system of existence, that is practice of hunting and gathering, zero or negative population growth, and extremely low levels of literacy in comparison with other tribal groups.

Groups that satisfied any of the criterion were considered to be a Primitive Tribal Group. At the conclusion of the Fifth Five year plan, 52 communities were identified as being a "primitive tribal group" based on recommendations made by Indian state governments. At the conclusion of the Sixth Five year plan 20 additional groups were added and 2 more were added in the Seventh Five year plan and finally one more group was added in the eighth five-year plan, for a total 75 groups were identified as Primitive Tribal Group. The 75th group recognised as PTG were the Maram in Manipur in 1993-94. No new group was declared as PTG on the basis of the 2001 census.

In 2006 the government of India changed the name of "Primitive tribal group" to "Particularly vulnerable tribal group" PTG has since been renamed Particularly vulnerable tribal group by the government of India.

Other issues
Until 2018 Particularly Vulnerable Tribal Groups were not allowed contraceptive use by the Indian Government because of their often declining or stagnant population growth. Based on the assumption that allowing them the use contraception would hamper efforts to increase the size of their populations. However in 2018 the High Court of Chhattisgarh in a Public Interest Litigation found this to be a violation of their right to privacy and ruled that they had the right to contraceptives. The PVTG of Chhattisgarh got these rights amidst concerns of family planning amongst many of them particularly the Baigas.

List
List of Particularly vulnerable tribal groups by state

References

Social groups of India
Caste system in India